Poul Mathiasen (born 17 October 1947) is a Danish former footballer who played as a left-back for Fremad Amager. He made one appearance for the Denmark national team in 1975.

References

External links
 
 

1947 births
Living people
Danish men's footballers
Association football fullbacks
Denmark international footballers
Fremad Amager players
Place of birth missing (living people)